Chariesthes leonensis is a species of beetle in the family Cerambycidae. It was described by Stephan von Breuning in 1939. It is known from Liberia, Senegal, the Ivory Coast, Guinea, and Sierra Leone.

References

Chariesthes
Beetles described in 1939